Uachdar is a settlement on the Outer Hebridean Island of Benbecula. Uachdar is within the parish of South Uist.

The settlement is home to the only bakery on Benbecula, MacLeans Hebridean Bakery, which also has a small shop in the same complex as the bakery itself.

References

External links

MacLeans Hebridean Bakery

Villages in the Outer Hebrides
Benbecula